Moritz Kaspar Nebel (born 25 September 1991) is a German footballer who plays as a midfielder for Swiss 2. Liga Interregional club FC Uster.

References 

1991 births
Living people
German footballers
German expatriate footballers
Association football midfielders
2. Bundesliga players
Regionalliga players
Bayernliga players
Swiss 1. Liga (football) players
2. Liga Interregional players
FC Augsburg players
FC Augsburg II players
FV Illertissen players
Sportspeople from Erlangen
Footballers from Bavaria
Expatriate footballers in Switzerland
German expatriate sportspeople in Switzerland